The Manimuktha River is a river in the Kallakurichi and Cuddalore districts of the Indian state of Tamil Nadu.

References

See also
List of rivers of Tamil Nadu

Rivers of Tamil Nadu
Viluppuram district
Rivers of India